An election of MEPs representing Germany constituency for the 1999–2004 term of the European Parliament was held in 1999.

Results

References

1999
1999 elections in Germany
Germany